Palanga International Airport is a regional international airport located near the resort town Palanga at the Baltic Sea. It is the third largest airport in Lithuania and focuses on short and mid-range routes to European destinations. It serves Lithuanian Baltic sea resorts of Palanga and the city of Klaipėda, and parts of Samogitia and western Latvia.

History
Palanga Airport started operations in 1937 at a site 7 kilometers East of the current terminal, near the Palanga-Darbėnai road. The Lithuanian Air Force pilots were trained there. In 1939, the first scheduled airline service in Lithuania began operating on Kaunas – Palanga route.

From 1940–1941, and again in 1945–1963, the airport was used by the Air Force of the Soviet Union. The new air strip and facilities at the current site first appeared during the post-World War II period. In 1963, the airport was converted to a civilian airport. In 1991, Palanga Airport was re-registered as a national airport owned and run by the state.

Since 1993, the number of passengers passing through the airport has been increasing annually. Between 1994 and 1997, the passenger terminal was renovated. Passenger services and luggage handling was modernized to comply with the requirements of the International Civil Aviation Organization (ICAO). Between 1994–1995, the flight control center was refurbished. In 1996–1997 the runway surface, and in 1998 the airport apron and taxiways were renovated. Since 1997, the airport joined the major international aviation organization ACI (Airports Council International).

After Lithuania became a member of the European Union, passengers in 2004 increased more than 60% in comparison with that of 2003.

Infrastructure improvements continued in 2007 with the construction of North terminal to expand the terminals' area by 2000 m2 as well as to comply with Schengen border crossing regimen. In June–October 2007 the runway 01/19 was expanded to 2280x45 meters along with installation of LIH (high intensity) lighting and embedding the runway centerline lights. The facility expansion completed in 2007 has made long-range route servicing a possibility. Over two hundred people are employed by the airport facilities.

Terminals
Two adjacent terminals connected by short walkways and a transit area serve the airport:
 The South Terminal was built in the seventies and modernized in the late nineties. It has been serving as the check-in area for all flights. It also houses airline offices and cafe/bar facilities.
 The new North Terminal opened on 26 October 2007, with 2000 m2 (21520 sq. ft.) of space, to augment airport capabilities to serve arrivals and departures to and from non-Schengen zone countries.

Because of one-level terminal buildings layout where both departures and arrivals are handled on the ground floor level, there are no jet bridges at the airport. Passengers are transported to and from the aircraft by specialized shuttles.

Airlines and destinations

The following airlines operate regular scheduled and charter flights at Palanga:

Statistics

 List of the busiest airports in the Baltic states

Planes used at the airport
Boeing 737
Airbus A220-300(mainly used by air Baltic)
Airbus A320
Bombardier Q400(usage has been discontinued since 2022-07-20)
CRJ900 
CRJ200 
ATR 42
but the airport dose contain small personal planes and is sometimes used for military exercises, that usually happen in Šiauliai International Airport wich is 143 kilometers away

Ground transportation
 Motorway A13 connects the airport with southern Palanga (7 km) and Klaipėda (32 km)
 Motorway A13 connects the airport with northern Liepāja (63 km) 
 A public bus links the airport with Palanga and Klaipeda coach bus stations.
 Scandinavian Airlines passengers are serviced by shuttle bus operating between Klaipėda and the airport.
  Latvian transfer company Flybus.lv provides transfer service from Palanga airport to Liepaja (LV) and vice versa. Shuttle buses are connected with Ryanair, WizzAir, Norwegian and other flights.

References

External links

 Official website
 

Airports in Lithuania
Airports built in the Soviet Union
Buildings and structures in Palanga
Airport
International airports in Lithuania